The Brazil national under-18 and under-19 basketball team, is controlled by the Brazilian Basketball Confederation, abbreviated as CBB, and represents Brazil in international under-19 and under-18 (under age 19 and under age 18) basketball competitions.

FIBA Under-19 World Championship

Head coach position
  Pablo Costa – 2013–2014

See also
Brazil national basketball team
Brazil women's national basketball team
Brazil national under-17 basketball team
Brazil national 3x3 team

References

External links
Official website
FIBA Profile
Latinbasket – Brazil Men National Team U18/19
Archived records of Brazil team participations

Men's national under-19 basketball teams
Basketball teams in Brazil
National youth sports teams of Brazil